The Museu de Arte Popular is an Art museum in Lisbon, Portugal.

It was originally designed by Veloso Reis and João Simões for the Portuguese World Exhibition's popular life pavilion in 1940, and after the exhibition was refurbished and in 1948.

References

External links
Official Museu de Arte Popular website—

Art museums and galleries in Portugal
Museums in Lisbon
Belém (Lisbon)
World's fair architecture in Lisbon
Museums established in 1948